Eva Moberg (1932–2011) was a Swedish author, playwright, and debater.

Biography 
Eva Moberg was the daughter of author Vilhelm Moberg and grew up in Stockholm. She graduated from secondary school in 1952, and in 1963 she became a licentiate of literary history, religious history, and practical philosophy with her thesis Kärlek och kön, en studie i Colettes diktning (English: Love and gender, a study of the poetry of Colette). She was editor of the Fredrika Bremer Association's periodical Hertha (1960–1962), culture editor in the weekly magazine Vi (1967–1976) and a columnist for Dagens Nyheter (1976–1992). She wrote about social issues, politics, and ethical questions. From 1968 to 1970 she held a position as a script writer for Sveriges Television, Sweden's national television network. There, she wrote a series of notable TV variety shows, and later several sitcoms.

Moberg was an early participant in the gender equality debate in Sweden. In 1961 she published the article "" (Woman's Conditional Release), which is considered a Swedish feminist classic. (See a link to it under "External links" below.) In that article she argued that equality between men and women was still far off, as women were still expected to see marrying and having children as their purpose in life. Her essay started an intense and long-lived debate on men's and women's roles in the family and the society at large. Group 222's and Moberg's ideas of an equitable society criticized the traditional man's role; they claimed to seek not only women's but also men's emancipation. "Men are better than the patriarchy" was one of Moberg's important ideas – it also became the title of a lecture she later held abroad in the 1990s.

In the 1970s, Moberg also became involved in campaigns against nuclear power and later in questions of pollution and as a champion of animal rights.

From 1964 to 1976, Moberg was married to TV producer , with whom she had a daughter in 1966. Moberg later lived, until her death, with author .

Selected list of works 
 "Kvinnans villkorliga frigivning" ("Woman's Release on Probation"), in the anthology Unga Liberaler: nio inlägg i idédebatten (Young liberals: nine contributions to the idea debate), Stockholm: Bonnier, 1961.
 Kvinnor och människor (Women and people), Stockholm: Bonnier, 1962. Tribunserien, 99-0152130-0
 Pengar eller livet?: exemplet kärnkraften (Money or life? The example of nuclear power), Stockholm: Bonnier, 1979. 
 Vad tar vi oss för?: tankar samlade i en sanslös tid (What are we doing?: thoughts collected in a senseless time), Stockholm: Timo, 1979. 
 Är krig naturligt? (Is war natural?), Stockholm: Fredsårsdelegationen, skriftserie, 0283-6912 ; 1, 1986
 Evas lilla gula: artiklar för återbruk (Eva's little yellow thing: articles for reuse), Stockholm: Dagens Nyheter, 1988.  
 Prima materia: texter i urval  (Prima materia: selected texts), including among others Kvinnans villkorliga frigivning (Women's conditional release). Stockholm: Ordfront 2003.

Children's Books 
 Barnen Bolinder (The Bolinder Children), 1973
 Martina drömmer (Martina dreams), 1985
 Urban, Raider och Martina (Urban, Raider and Martina), 1986
 Fabian och färgerna (Fabian and the colours), 1991

Theater 
 Prylar, 1987
 Svindlande skönhet, 1990
 Hög svansföring, 1994
 Himladjuren, 1996
 Eroterapi, 2001

TV-productions 
 Provokationer, 1967 
 Grov kränkning, 1968 
 Konfrontation, 1969
 Dom kallas människor, 1970
 Horoskopet, 1971
 Televisioner I-IV, 1973–1974
 Sagan om tåget, 1978
 Tillfälligt avbrott, 1978–79 (co-author)
 Skapelsens krona, 1980 (with Gottfried Grafström)
 Liten tuva, 1985 (with Gottfried Grafström)
 Dokument bakifrån, I – III 1986 
 Jesu syster, 1987

Radio productions 
 Fritagningen, 1981 
 Avskedsmiddag, 1984

References

Further reading

External links 
 Kvinnans villkorliga frigivning
 Official webpage 
 Eva Moberg, minnesord av Ulrika Knutsson i tidningen Focus 2011-06-03 
 Eva Moberg in LIBRIS

1932 births
2011 deaths
Swedish feminists
Swedish women writers
Swedish-language writers